Global protests may refer to:

Specific-focus global protests

Anti-war
 Protests against the Iraq War that started in 2002, including:
 15 February 2003 anti-war protests of 6–10 million people in 600 cities in 60 countries
 International protests over the 2021 Israel–Palestine crisis, from 11 May to 20 May.
 Protests against the 2022 Russian invasion of Ukraine, starting in February 2022

Pro-climate
 School strike for the climate, on 15 March and 24 May 2019 in 100–125 countries
 September 2019 climate strikes on 20 and 27 September 2019 by 4–8 million people in 150 countries